Windmill is a census-designated place in Hidalgo County, New Mexico, United States. Its population was 43 as of the 2010 census. The community is located along New Mexico State Road 9.

The community was founded in the 1970s. While it is located on a windy plain, as of 1991 it did not have a windmill despite its name.

Geography

Demographics

References

Census-designated places in New Mexico
Census-designated places in Hidalgo County, New Mexico